Tabernaemontana sessilifolia is a species of plant in the family Apocynaceae. It is found in Madagascar.

References

sessilifolia
Taxa named by John Gilbert Baker